The Art of Unix Programming by Eric S. Raymond is a book about the history and culture of Unix programming from its earliest days in 1969 to 2003 when it was published, covering both genetic derivations such as BSD and conceptual ones such as Linux.

The author utilizes a comparative approach to explaining Unix by contrasting it to other operating systems including desktop-oriented ones such as Microsoft Windows and the classic Mac OS to ones with research roots such as EROS and Plan 9 from Bell Labs.
The book was published by Addison-Wesley, September 17, 2003,  and is also available online, under a Creative Commons license with additional clauses.

Contributors
The book contains many contributions, quotations and comments from UNIX gurus past and present. These include:

Ken Arnold (author of curses and co-author of Rogue)
Steve Bellovin
Stuart Feldman
Jim Gettys
Stephen C. Johnson
Brian Kernighan
David Korn
Mike Lesk
Doug McIlroy
Marshall Kirk McKusick
Keith Packard
Henry Spencer
Ken Thompson

See also
Unix philosophy
The Hacker Ethic and the Spirit of the Information Age

References

External links
 Online book (HTML edition)
 
 The Art of Unix Programming at FAQs

2003 non-fiction books
Books by Eric S. Raymond
Computer programming books
Creative Commons-licensed books
Unix books